Friendly Fire is a poem written by James Michie. The poem was published in The Spectator magazine in 2004. It called for the "extermination" of Scottish people, though it has been described as satirical. As a result, it has been the subject of controversy, especially regarding Boris Johnson, who, as editor of The Spectator at the time, approved its publication.

Criticism 
Upon the initial publication of the poem in 2004, Maureen Fraser, then director of the Commission for Racial Equality in Scotland, said:We find this poem very offensive and the language is deeply inflammatory. It does nothing to promote race relations and undermines relations between Scotland and the rest of Britain, and our relationship with other countries. Some of the language, such as 'comprehensive extermination' and 'polluting our stock', is completely and utterly unacceptable. It cannot be tolerated.

In June 2019, the poem began circulating on the internet as a criticism of Boris Johnson for having anti-Scottish prejudice (with some incorrectly attributing Johnson as the author of the poem). The poem was raised in House of Commons by SNP MP Ian Blackford.

References 

2004 poems
The Spectator